Erk or ERK may refer to:

Politics 
 Erk (historic party), a socialist party in Bashkiria, Bukhara and Turkestan from 1919 to 1921
 Erk Democratic Party, a political party in Uzbekistan

People
 Edmund Frederick Erk (1872–1953), American politician
 Erk Russell (1926–2006), American college football coach
 Erk Sens-Gorius (born 1946), German fencer
 Kutlay Erk, Cypriot politician
 Ludwig Erk (1807–1883), German musicologist

Fictional Characters
 Erk, a mage from the tactical role-playing game Fire Emblem: The Blazing Blade

Other uses
 Erk, Hungary, a municipality in Hungary
 Enköpings RK, a Swedish rugby union club
 Extracellular signal-regulated kinases, a kind of protein molecule
 Nafsan language
 Erk, an aircraftman in Royal Air Force slang